The  is a coal-fired thermal power station operated by the  Sakai Joint Power Co., Ltd  in the city of Sakata, Yamagata, Japan. The facility is located on the Sea of Japan coast of Honshu. The Sakata Joint Power Co., Ltd is a joint venture between Tohoku Electric and Sumitomo Light Aluminum Company,

History
Unit 1 of the Sakata Kyodo Thermal Power Station started operation in October 1977, followed by Unit 2 in October 1978. Initially, both units were designed to burn heavy oil; however, Unit 1 was converted to coal in 1984 and Unit 2 was converted to coal in October 1978 and a mixture of coal and biomass (wood pellets) in May 2011, with heavy oil and light oil also usable as auxiliary fuel. 

Coal ash from the plant is recycled into raw materials for cement and into fertilizers.

Plant details

See also 

 Energy in Japan
 List of power stations in Japan

External links
Tohoku Electric list of major power stations
official home page

1977 establishments in Japan
Energy infrastructure completed in 1977
Coal-fired power stations in Japan
Sakata, Yamagata
Biofuel power stations in Japan
Buildings and structures in Yamagata Prefecture